Lavizan (Persian:لَویزان, also romanized as Lavizān) is a forest park located in Shemiranat County in Tehran Province, Iran (North East Tehran). Lavizan Forest Park is a recreation area used by people from Lavizan and Tehran. Its area is about 1100 hectares.

Vegetation 
List of vegetation in Lavizan Forest Park:

 Cypress
 Platanus
 Oak
 Robinia
 Maple

Features 
List of features in Lavizan Forest Park:

 Snack bar
 Coffee shop (café)
 Public toilet
 Pergola
 Mosque

Tehran Birds Garden 
Tehran Birds Garden is other tourist attraction in Lavizan Forest Park.

References 

Forest parks
Parks in Tehran
Forest parks in Iran